Tabanus yulensis is a species of horse fly in the family Tabanidae.

Distribution
New Guinea.

References

Tabanidae
Insects described in 1892
Diptera of Australasia